The Love and Power Tour also referred too as The If I Can’t Have Love I Want Power Tour was the fourth headlining concert tour by American singer Halsey, in support of her fourth studio album, If I Can't Have Love, I Want Power (2021). The tour began in West Palm Beach on May 17 and concluded in Las Vegas on September 24. Halsey announced the tour on January 31, 2022.

Background 
During the first leg of the Manic World Tour in March 2020, Halsey announced that due to the state of the pandemic and international lockdowns, the tour would be pushed back a year and that all tickets would still be valid at the same venues in 2021. In January of that year, Halsey had announced that she would be officially cancelling the rest of the tour for the safety of her team and fans. Days later, Halsey announced she was pregnant with her first child, who was born in July 2021. While initially on the Manic World Tour, Halsey originally stated it would be her last tour for "a very long time". Upon the announcement of the Love and Power Tour, Halsey stated, "it's been far too long and I could not be more excited to see you all."

The tour was supported by four openers: Beabadoobee & PinkPantheress for the first half of the tour and The Marías & Abby Roberts for the second half. Wolf Alice was featured as support for the Los Angeles show. The Gulf Shores, New York City, and Milwaukee shows will be part of various festivals.

Setlist 
This is the setlist from the show on May 17, 2022 in West Palm Beach. It is not intended to represent all dates of the tour.

Chapter 1: The Capture
 "The Tradition"
 "Castle"
 "Easier Than Lying"
 "You Should Be Sad"
 "1121" (John Cunningham demo version; contains elements from "Die for Me")

Chapter 2: Release
 "Graveyard"
 "Colors"
 "Hurricane"
 "Lilith"
 "The Lighthouse"
 "Killing Boys"
 "Girl Is a Gun"

Chapter 3: Reflect
 "Be Kind"
 "More"
 "Darling"
 "Honey"
 "3AM"
 "Bad at Love"
 "You Asked for This"
 "Whispers"
 "Gasoline"

Epilogue: Revenge
 "Nightmare"
 "Experiment on Me"
 "Without Me"
 "I Am Not a Woman, I'm a God"

Tour dates

Cancelled shows

Notes

References 

Halsey (singer) concert tours
2022 concert tours